is a passenger railway station on the Saikyō Line located in Chūō-ku, Saitama, Saitama Prefecture, Japan, operated by the East Japan Railway Company (JR East).

Lines
Some trains continue northward to  via the Kawagoe Line and southward to  via the TWR Rinkai Line. The station is located 19.0 km from Ikebukuro Station. The station identification colour is "tokiwa green".

Station layout

The station consists of one elevated island platform serving two tracks, with the station building located underneath. Additional passing tracks lie on either side of the station for non-stop rapid services. The tracks of the Tōhoku Shinkansen also run adjacent to this station, on the west side.

The station used to have a "Midori no Madoguchi" staffed ticket office, but this closed on 31 October 2007.

Platforms

History
The station opened on 30 September 1985.

Passenger statistics
In fiscal 2019, the station was used by an average of 18,917 passengers daily (boarding passengers only).

The passenger figures for previous years are as shown below.

Surrounding area
 Saitama University

See also
List of railway stations in Japan

References

External links

 Minami-Yono Station information (JR East) 

Railway stations in Saitama Prefecture
Railway stations in Japan opened in 1985
Saikyō Line
Stations of East Japan Railway Company
Railway stations in Saitama (city)